Johnny Porter Jackson (March 3, 1951 – March 1, 2006) was an American drummer, noted for being the drummer for The Jackson 5 from their early Gary, Indiana days until the end of their famed career at Motown.

Career
The label promoted Jackson and keyboardist Ronnie Rancifer as the cousins of The Jackson Five, however neither Ronnie Rancifer nor Johnny Jackson are actually related to the Jacksons.

On March 1, 2006, Jackson died at a home in Gary after being stabbed by his girlfriend, Yolanda Davis, following a quarrel. Davis was later pleaded guilty to involuntary manslaughter and was sentenced to 2 years in prison.

Notes

References
Johnny Porter Jackson at Find-A-Grave

1955 births
2006 deaths
Murdered African-American people
American murder victims
African-American drummers
Musicians from Gary, Indiana
20th-century American drummers
American male drummers
American funk drummers
Soul drummers
Rhythm and blues drummers
Deaths by stabbing in Indiana
20th-century American male musicians
2006 murders in the United States
20th-century African-American musicians
21st-century African-American people